Holy Smoke is the fourth solo studio album by English musician Peter Murphy. It was released on 14 April 1992 through Beggars Banquet Records. Produced by Mike Thorne, the album features contributions from Alison Limerick, Jonathan Carney, Audrey Riley and The Hundred Men, his backing band since 1988's Love Hysteria album.

Although the album didn't meet with the commercial success of its predecessor, Deep (1990), it peaked at number 108 on Billboard 200 chart. The lead single off the album, "The Sweetest Drop", peaked at number 2 on Billboard Modern Rock Tracks chart.

Critical reception
Ned Raggett of AllMusic was mixed in his assessment of the album. He stated: "Released in the initial craze of the grunge/alternative mega-crossover, Smokes elegant ballads and angular, arty rockers simply didn't fit in." Nevertheless, he also described the album as "quite a strong release, due to "avoiding any cloning of Deep or "Cuts You Up" in favor of a different approach meant to bring out the band's live power more directly." He also praised Mike Thorne's production work, commenting that it gives the album "a crisp, solid punch throughout, even during its quieter moments." Bill Wyman of Entertainment Weekly also praised the albums "sophisticated" production, calling it as "lush and very adult." He also wrote: "When the music and lyrics come together, it's almost touching, as on the sardonically named "Hit Song", which sounds to me like a vampire pleading for his mortality back."

Track listing

Personnel
 Peter Murphy – vocals, production, composition, guitar (6); keyboards (7)

The Hundred Men
 Terl Bryant – drums, percussion
 Eddie Branch – bass
 Paul Statham –  bass (6); acoustic guitar (7); keyboards
 Peter Bonas – guitar, acoustic guitar

Additional musicians
 Gini Ball – strings (9)
 Jonathan Carney – strings (9)
 Zoe Caryl – backing vocals (4, 9)
 Alison Limerick – vocals (4, 9)
 Chris Pitsillides – strings (9)
 Audrey Riley – strings (9)
 Rick Shaffer – guitar (5, 8)
 John Vartan – ney (1); zurna (1); tambura (7)

Other personnel
 Mike Thorne – production, synclavier
 Jason Appleton – production assistant
 Jack Skinner – mastering
 Fernando Kral – engineering, mixing
 Anton Corbijn – photography
 Stuart Every – assistant engineer
 Laura Janisse – production assistant

Chart positions

Album

Singles

References

External links
 

1992 albums
Peter Murphy (musician) albums
Albums produced by Mike Thorne
Beggars Banquet Records albums